Pelican Blood is a 2010 film which premiered at the 2010 Edinburgh Film Festival. It is a low-budget film, shot in a freewheeling style, directed by Karl Golden, adapted from Cris Freddi's novel by Cris Cole. The two main protagonists, Nikko (Harry Treadaway), and Stevie (Emma Booth), are self-destructive people who have met through a suicide website. Nikko has an obsessive compulsive personality.

"Pelican Blood is a fraught drama about youthful angst and rebelliousness set (very incongruously) in the world of birdwatching...  that evokes memories of Trainspotting...[It] doesn't really hang together. None the less, there is enough raw talent here to enable the film to take wing."

External links
 Pelican Blood at Ecosse Films

References

2010 films
British drama films
2010 drama films
English-language Irish films
2010s English-language films
2010s British films